Dominion was a British band from Thornhill, Dewsbury, that played a mix of death metal and doom metal genres. It featured a female singer, Michelle Richfield, and two male singers, Mass Firth and Arno Cagna. The band released two albums in the late 1990s on Peaceville Records and then split up. Drummer Bill Law temporarily played in My Dying Bride. Richfield and North later formed the band Sear. Firth now plays in the death metal band Nailed. In 2006 their former record label Peaceville decided to release an 18 track compilation album entitled Threshold A Retrospective. This featured songs from the albums Interface and Blackout, in addition to songs that were earlier released on the Under the Sign of the Sacred Star Peaceville compilation album. A version of the Tears For Fears song "Shout", originally released on the Peaceville X album, has now gone on to be a classic in metal clubs across the UK. This 2006 release got great reviews in the press, and saw Dominion getting a KKKK (out of a possible 5K's) review in Kerrang! magazine, hailing the band as "Brit Metal Pioneers and a criminally overlooked band". Furthermore, the track Release which originally featured on the album Blackout was to appear on a cover mount CD for the magazine Metal Hammer. The band has received significant positive attention in the decade after their demise.

Members
 Michelle Richfield - vocals
 Mass Firth - vocals, guitar
 Arno Cagna - vocals, guitar
 Danny North - bass
 Bill Law - drums

Discography
 Interface (CD,  1996)
 Blackout (CD, 1997)
 Threshold - a Retrospective (Compilation CD, 2006)

English death metal musical groups
English doom metal musical groups
Musical groups established in 1996
Musical groups disestablished in 1998